José Juan Francisco Alfonso Serrano Cacho (b. Mexico City, October 30, 1937) is a Mexican architect.

Biography 

Serrano was son of the architect Francisco J. Serrano. He studied at Universidad Iberoamericana until 1960. Afterwards he worked together with José Nava in the bureau of his father. From 1960 to 1971 he taught at the Universidad Iberoamericana, the Universidad Nacional Autónoma de México and at the Universidad La Salle. Some of his projects he realized in cooperation with Teodoro González de León and with Carlos Tejeda, and some buildings together with Susana García Fuertes.

Serrano has been numbered member (Miembro de Número) of the Academia de Artes since 1998 . In 2003 he was awarded with the National Prize for Arts and Sciences, category "fine arts". He is Honorary Fellow of the American Institute of Architects.

Selected works 
 Mexican embassy in Brazil, together with Abraham Zabludovsky, 1973–1976
 Mining center in Pachuca, together with González de León and Tedaja, 1986–1988
 Tomás Garrido Canabal Park in Villahermosa, together with González de León and Aurelio Nuño Morales, 1983–1985
 Palacio de Justicia Federal, together with González de León and Carlos Tejada, 1987–1992
 Library of Tabasco, Villahermosa, 1990
 Centro Corporativo Bosques, together with González de León and Carlos Tejada, 1990–1995
 Mexican embassy in Berlin-Tiergarten, 2000/2001 together with Teodoro Gonzalez de Leon
 Reconstruction of the university campus of the Universidad Iberoamericana, together with Carlos Mijares Bracho

References

External links 
 

Modernist architects from Mexico
1937 births
Living people
Architects from Mexico City
Academic staff of Universidad La Salle México
Universidad Iberoamericana alumni
Academic staff of Universidad Iberoamericana
20th-century Mexican architects
21st-century Mexican architects